The 2011 Gomelsky Cup is a European basketball competition that occurred between September 24 and September 25 in Moscow.

Participants
  CSKA Moscow - host
  Fenerbahçe Ülker - Euroleague participant
  Panathinaikos Athens - Euroleague participant
  Žalgiris Kaunas - Euroleague participant

Results 

2011
2011–12 in Russian basketball
2011–12 in Lithuanian basketball
2011–12 in Greek basketball
2011–12 in Turkish basketball